Asiadodis yunnanensis is a species of praying mantis in the family Mantidae. It is found in China, Myanmar, and Thailand.

See also
List of mantis genera and species

References

Y
Mantodea of Asia
Insects of China
Fauna of Yunnan
Insects described in 1995